Ganoderma tornatum is a fungal plant pathogen in the genus Ganoderma. It is a species of basidiomycete fungi in the family Polyporaceae (members are also known as bracket fungi, or polypores). 

Like other polypores, its physical characteristics include a rigid and tough texture and a shelf-like appearance. Most specimens of G. tornatum have a dark brown upper surface, though the ones found in the northwest of India and Pakistan have a lighter appearance. Ganoderma tornatum also have thin, shiny horn-like layers, distinguishing them from Ganoderma applanatum. It does not have a long and thin stipe like Ganoderma cochlear. 

It is distributed widely throughout the tropics, appearing to be one of the most common species of Ganoderma there. Some places it occurs is south of the Sahara desert, the shores of the Pacific Ocean in Canada, and the north west of India and Pakistan, and from the Philippines to New Caledonia and Papua. It is not clear if this species occurs in South America, as few specimens are available. 

Physiologically, their mode of transmission is likely primarily through air-borne spores, as no rhizomorphs have been found.  While temperature increases decrease their spore size  its spore size was found to be 7.5-8.35-9.5 X 5-5.8-7 micrometers in one sample. In addition to parasitizing oil palms, the Ganoderma tornatum has a variety of hosts, in comparison to other Ganoderma species. 

References

External links 
 USDA ARS Fungal Database

Fungal plant pathogens and diseases
Ganodermataceae
Fungi described in 1828
Taxa named by Christiaan Hendrik Persoon